Pavlovka is a rural locality (a selo) in Vasilyevsky Selsoviet of Belogorsky District, Amur Oblast, Russia. The population was 202 as of 2018. There are  2 streets.

Geography 
Pavlovka is located on the left bank of the Tom River, 19 km southeast of Belogorsk (the district's administrative centre) by road. Vasilyevka is the nearest rural locality.

References 

Rural localities in Belogorsky District